This is a list of notable swimwear brands and manufacturers.

References

Lists of brands
Lists of manufacturers
Clothing-related lists